Károly Kovács (4 November 1931 – 20 October 2007) was a Hungarian jurist and diplomat, who served as Hungarian Charge d'Affaires ad interim to the United States in 1975.

He entered foreign service in 1965. He subsequently served in Ottawa (1965–1970). He was a Hungarian delegate at the International Commission of Control and Supervision (ICCS) between 1973 and 1974, during the final stage of the Vietnam War. He was Deputy Chief of Mission at the Embassy of Hungary in Washington, D.C. from 1974 to 1978. Returning home, he belonged to the Foreign Affairs Department's staff of the Hungarian Socialist Workers' Party (MSZMP) between 1978 and 1984.

He served as Hungarian Ambassador to Pakistan between 1984 and 1988, Then he was head of the foreign service's Personnel and Education Department between 1988 and 1990. After that he served as Hungarian Ambassador to the Philippines from 1991 to 1993. He retired on 31 December 1993.

References

Sources

External links
 Diplomatic Representation for Hungary

1931 births
2007 deaths
Ambassadors of Hungary to the United States
Members of the Hungarian Socialist Workers' Party
Eötvös Loránd University alumni
People from Bács-Kiskun County
Ambassadors of Hungary to Pakistan
Ambassadors of Hungary to the Philippines